Shobana Kamineni is an Indian business executive and the executive vice-chairperson of Apollo Hospitals.

Early and personal life 
Kamineni is the daughter of Prathap C. Reddy, the founder and chair of Apollo Hospitals. She has three sisters, Preetha, Suneeta Reddy and Sangita, who are all working as executives in Apollo Hospitals.

Kamineni is married to Anil Kamineni, a businessman and wildlife conservationist. They are the parents of two daughters, Upasana Konidela and Anushpala. Upasana is married to Telugu filmstar Konidela Ram Charan, son of filmstar Konidela Chiranjeevi. Anushpala married Armaan Ebrahim, a Muslim racing car driver, in December 2021.

Career
Thanks to being her father's daughter, Kamineni has held various positions in the company founded by him since a young age. She served as the president of the Confederation of Indian Industry from 2017 to 2018. She was the first woman to hold this position. Kamineni has received an honorary doctorate from Bryant University, USA, in recognition of her work in healthcare and pharmaceuticals.

References 

Indian women business executives
Living people
People from Chennai
Year of birth missing (living people)